Hóa Sơn is a commune (xã) and village in Minh Hóa District, Quảng Bình Province, in Vietnam.

As of 1999, Hóa Sơn has a population of 1,411 with an estimated population density of 8 people per km². It covers an area of 174.88 km².

References
    

Populated places in Quảng Bình province
Communes of Quảng Bình province